Zareena Moidu, known by her stage name Nadia Moidu or simply Nadhiya, is an Indian actress who predominantly appears in Tamil, Malayalam and Telugu films. She made her debut in the 1984 Malayalam-language film Nokketha Doorathu Kannum Nattu for which she won Filmfare Award for Best Actress – Malayalam. She subsequently starred in a series of commercially successful films. After her marriage in 1988, she lived in the United States and later in the United Kingdom with her husband Shirish Godbole and two daughters before moving back to India in 2007.

She made her comeback in Tamil films with M. Kumaran S/O Mahalakshmi, and received critical acclaim for her performance. In 2008, she signed on as the brand ambassador for Arokya Milk and Thangamayil Jewellery. Nadiya hosts a popular television show called Jackpot, replacing actress Khushboo on Jaya TV. In 2013, she received critical acclaim for both the roles she played, one as actor Varun Tej's mother in the Telugu-language film Ghani and also for playing a stubborn aunt in Attarintiki Daredi. She received the Nandi Award for Best Supporting Actress  for her performance in Attarintiki Daredi in 2013.

Early life
Nadiya was born to Malayali parents and spent her childhood in Sion, Mumbai. Her father, N. K. Moidu, is a Muslim from Thalassery and her mother, Lalitha, is a Hindu from Thiruvalla. She had her primary education from The J. B. Vachha High School for Parsi Girls, Mumbai, and her pre-university degree from Sir Jamsetjee Jeejebhoy School of Art. She couldn't continue her college studies after that as she became busy with movies by then. She earned her associate degree in Media Management and B.A. in Communication Arts - Radio & Television, while living in United States.

Personal life
Nadiya married Shirish Godbole in 1988. The couple has two daughters Sanam and Jana. After their wedding, she lived in the United States with her husband and daughters. In the year 2000, she moved to London, United Kingdom and lived there until 2007. She returned to India in 2008 and currently resides in Mumbai with her family.

Career
Nadhiya made her debut in the Malayalam film Nokketha Doorathu Kannum Nattu (1984), alongside Mohanlal and Padmini for which she won the Filmfare Award for Best Actress – Malayalam. This movie was remade in Tamil as Poove Poochudava in 1985 with Padmini and marked her debut in Tamil.

Nadhiya claims she was considered for the role of Revathi in Mouna Ragam, a 1986 Tamil film, but declined due to prior commitments.

In the mid-1990s, she made a brief comeback as an actress, before moving to the US.

Filmography

Short films

Television

References

External links
 
 Nadiya Moithu at MSI

Actresses in Tamil cinema
People from Thalassery
Living people
Year of birth missing (living people)
Actresses in Malayalam cinema
Indian film actresses
People from Bandra
Actresses from Mumbai
Actresses in Telugu cinema
20th-century Indian actresses
21st-century Indian actresses